The Magic Boomerang is an Australian children's adventure series set in rural Australia. It was produced by Pacific films and aired on the ABC in Australia.

Synopsis 
The show follows the adventures of a young boy who can stop time by throwing a magic boomerang.

Cast 
Principal cast members included:

Series 1: David Morgan (Tom Thumbleton), Telford Jackson (Dan Thumbleton), Penny Shelton (Gwen Thumbleton), Rodney Pearlman ('Wombat').

Series 2: Robert Brockman (Nugget Morris), William Hodge (Charles Swinbourne), Chris Christensen (Bluey), Peter Aanensen ('Tiger' Martin).

International screenings
Episodes of The Magic Boomerang were also screened in New Zealand, the UK, Canada, Malaysia and Italy.

Remaining episodes
The NFSA holds 25 episodes, while the National Archives of Australia holds copies of all 45 episode in their audio-visual collection.

Episodes

Series 1

1. The Discovery
2. Christmas Cracker
3. A Visit From Grandma
4. Wombat Finds A Friend
5. The Hunter
6. No Mail Today
7. A Matter of Survival
8. The Bushranger
9. Ill Wind
10. The Thief Who Believed in Magic
11. Fire Trap
12. The Hypnotist
13. The Uncatchables
14. North To Warralinga
15. The Big Catch
16. Moonlight Reef
17. Aunt Matilda
18. The Cattle Duffers
19. The Saucer From Venus
20. The Masked Man From Manangatang
21. Moomba
22. Gentleman Jackaroo
23. Head of the River
24. The Vanishing Spell
25. The Stand-In
26. Race Against Time
27. The Auction
28. A Lesson For Wombat
29. Friend Or Foe
30. The Good Turn
31. Pony Express
32. The Last Lap
33. Salt 'n' Pepper
34. Mother's Day
35. A Night at the Thumbleton's
36. My Friend Higgins
37. Stranger in Town
38. Mr. Santa Claus
39. The Messenger

Series 2

40. Bushranger's Gold
41. Buried Treasure
42. Luck of The Game
43. Boys Camp
44. Double Trouble
45. Hollermakers Bargain

See also 
 List of Australian television series
 List of Australian Broadcasting Corporation programs

References

http://www.abc.net.au/corp/history/75years/timeline/1960s.pdf

External links 
 http://www.classicaustraliantv.com/magicboomg.htm

1965 Australian television series debuts
Australian children's television series
Australian Broadcasting Corporation original programming
Television shows set in Victoria (Australia)
Black-and-white Australian television shows
Television series by Fremantle (company)
Australian preschool education television series